Lophocampa albipennis is a moth of the family Erebidae. It was described by George Hampson in 1904. It is found on the Bahamas.

Description

Female
Head and thorax white; tegulae and patagia with indistinct fuscous annuli; palpi with fuscous marks at sides; legs with slight fuscous bands, the fore femora yellow above; abdomen white, dorsally yellow except at extremity. Forewing white with numerous waved interrupted fuscous lines forming obscure annuli; an antemedial semicircular mark on costa; a discoidal lunule with illdefined oblique band formed by the waved lines from it to inner margin. Hindwing pure white.

Wingspan, 50–54 mm.

References

 

albipennis
Moths described in 1904